Cosimo Commisso is a Canadian cell biologist and cancer researcher who has made significant advances in the field of cellular trafficking and cancer metabolism. Among his most notable contributions are the discovery and study of how macropinocytosis supports tumor cell growth and survival by serving as an amino acid supply route in Ras-mutated cancers. He is currently an assistant professor in the Tumor Initiation and Maintenance Program at the Sanford Burnham Prebys Medical Discovery Institute NCI-designated Cancer Center in La Jolla, California, USA.

External links 
 Faculty profile at SBPdiscovery.org
 Commisso lab homepage

References 

Living people
Canadian medical researchers
Year of birth missing (living people)
Canadian people of Italian descent